Surinder Pal Dhammi, better known as Surinder Shinda is an Indian singer of Punjabi music who is considered a "grandfather of moc", and has been described as "legendary". He has had numerous hit songs including "Jatt Jeona Morh", "Putt Jattan De", "Truck Billiya", "Balbiro Bhabhi" and "Kaher Singh Di Mout". He has also appeared in Punjabi films such as Putt Jattan De and Ucha Dar Babe Nanak Da.

Biography
Surinder  Shinda was born Surinder Pal Dhammi in a Ramgharia Sikh family. Surinder Shinda was born on 20 May 1953 in Village Choti Ayali, district Ludhiana, Punjab. He hails from Ludhiana, Punjab, India. He was a colleague of the Punjabi singer Kuldeep Manak and has also taught music to the late Amar Singh Chamkila, Gill Hardeep, Maninder Shinda, Shinda's son. He is famous for his Kali (a singing-style) with Kuldeep Manak and several others. His "Jeona Morh" is considered a legend in Punjabi music. His song "Badla Le Layeen Sohneya" is  one of the greatest hits of Punjabi music ever.

In 2013 he was awarded a Lifetime Achievement award at the Brit Asia TV Music Awards.

Personal life
Shinda is married to the cousin of Dev Tharikewala's wife who is known to have written lyrics for Shinda and Kuldeep Manak.

Current career
Shinda currently works as a producer for younger artists. In addition, his latest album Dhulla Bhatti was successful in the Punjabi music market. Surinder Shinda is still singing today, with his latest single, "Hemis Boliyan."

Discography

Duo collaboration

Filmography

References

External links

{{   |https://www.mywhatsappimages.com/2020/06/surinder-shinda-singer-hd-pictures.html?m=1}}

Musicians from Ludhiana
Indian male playback singers
Indian Sikhs
Living people
Year of birth missing (living people)
Punjabi singers
Male actors in Punjabi cinema
Male actors from Ludhiana
Singers from Punjab, India
20th-century Indian singers
21st-century Indian singers
20th-century Indian male actors
21st-century Indian male actors
20th-century Indian composers
21st-century Indian composers
Indian male film actors
20th-century Indian male singers
21st-century Indian male singers